The Ocoee Street Historic District is a historic district and neighborhood located in downtown Cleveland, Tennessee along U.S. Route 11 that was listed on the National Register of Historic Places (NRHP) on December 13, 1995. It is located adjacent to the Centenary Avenue Historic District consists of many homes individually listed on the NRHP.

Description
The NRHP listing defines the historic district as being located between the 1455 and 1981 block of North Ocoee Street just north of the downtown business district near Lee University. However most consider the district to stretch to near the center of the downtown business district, encompassing other historic homes, including the P.M. Craigmiles House. The district consists of multiple homes in Colonial Revival (more than 70 percent), Tudor Revival, and Queen Anne architectural styles, many built before 1900.  

See also
National Register of Historic Places listings in Bradley County, Tennessee
Centenary Avenue Historic District, also NRHP-listed in Cleveland
Cleveland Commercial Historic District, also NRHP-listed in Cleveland

References

Neighborhoods in Cleveland, Tennessee
National Register of Historic Places in Bradley County, Tennessee
Geography of Bradley County, Tennessee
Populated places in Bradley County, Tennessee
Historic districts on the National Register of Historic Places in Tennessee